Marshala Zhukova or Posyolok Marshala Zhukova is a rural locality (a settlement) in Klyukvinsky Selsoviet Rural Settlement, Kursky District, Kursk Oblast, Russia. Population:

Geography 
The settlement is located 98 km from the Russia–Ukraine border, 8 km east of the district center – the town Kursk, 1.5 km from the selsoviet center – Dolgoye.

 Climate
Marshala Zhukova has a warm-summer humid continental climate (Dfb in the Köppen climate classification).

History 
The settlement in honor of general Georgy Zhukov was established in 1994 in the place of a cleared forest. They were built by Turkish workers and the construction took about 6 months. The locality was intended for the Russian military units withdrawn from East Germany. There are 6 residential blocks and 160 houses. The architecture of the settlement seems rather monotonous: more than 150 identical 3-, 4- and 5-storey multidwellings. In the building of the "Officers' House" there is the St. George Orthodox Church.

Transport 
Marshala Zhukova is located 1 km from the federal route  (Kursk – Voronezh –  "Kaspy" Highway; a part of the European route ), on the road of intermunicipal significance  (R-298 – Durnevo), 3.5 km from the nearest railway station Klyukva (railway line Klyukva — Belgorod).

The rural locality is situated 5 km from Kursk Vostochny Airport, 118 km from Belgorod International Airport and 200 km from Voronezh Peter the Great Airport.

References

Notes

Sources

Rural localities in Kursky District, Kursk Oblast